Rudolphus Antonius "Roy" Makaay (born 9 March 1975) is a Dutch former footballer. As a striker, he was known for his goal-scoring ability as a result of his "aerial prowess and quick drives to the net where he can put the ball away with either foot."

He began his career at Vitesse and Tenerife before moving to Deportivo de La Coruña in 1999 and helping the side to their first La Liga title in his first season there. He also won the Copa del Rey in 2002 and the following season was given the European Golden Boot for a 29-goal haul. He remains the club's all-time leading goalscorer. He then moved to Bayern Munich for a then club record €18.75 million, where he picked up the nickname Das Phantom (the phantom), for his ability to score out of nowhere, as well as Tormaschine (goal machine), for his consistent ability to find the back of the net.  After winning two consecutive Bundesliga and DFB-Pokal doubles at Bayern, he returned to the Netherlands with Feyenoord in 2007.

A full international from 1996 to 2005, Makaay scored 6 international goals in 43 matches despite competition for a place in the national team. He competed with the Dutch side at two UEFA European Championships and the 2008 Olympics.

Club career

Early career
He was first recognized as a talented striker while playing for Vitesse in the mid-1990s and honed his skills at the Spanish First Division with Tenerife and later with Deportivo La Coruña.

Deportivo La Coruña
In July 1999, Makaay was signed by Deportivo La Coruña from Tenerife for a transfer fee of PTAS10 million. He made his league debut on 22 August 1999 in the opening game of the season, where he scored a hat-trick to give Deportivo a 4–1 home victory over Alavés. Makaay scored a total of 22 goals in 36 appearances in the 1999–2000 season, including braces against Barcelona, Real Oviedo, and Atlético Madrid, as well as adding one in their final match against Espanyol to inspire the Galician club to their first La Liga title.

Makaay was an unused substitute as Dépor reached the 2002 Copa del Rey Final on 6 March 2002; Deportivo lifted the trophy for the second time in their history with a 2–1 victory over Real Madrid.

He was the European Golden Boot winner for the 2002–03 season with his 29 goals making him the top scorer in Europe.

His first encounter with Bayern Munich came during the 2002–03 UEFA Champions League season when he scored a hat-trick at the Olympiastadion in Munich, in Deportivo's 3–2 win over the Bavarians on 19 September 2002.

Bayern Munich

Bayern Munich kept a close eye on Makaay throughout the whole season and finally beat off stiff challenges from Manchester United and Chelsea to get their man. A then club record fee of €18.75 million was paid to Deportivo in the summer 2003 to sign him. He scored 78 Bundesliga and 17 UEFA Champions League goals during his four seasons at Bayern.

On 29 September 2004, he scored a hat-trick in a 4–0 Champions League group stage win over Ajax, putting him in a select group of players to have scored a Champions League hat-trick at two clubs.

On 21 August 2006, Makaay scored Bayern Munich's 3,000th Bundesliga goal. On 31 March 2007, he scored his 100th Bayern Munich goal in the game against FC Schalke 04. It was his 75th Bundesliga goal and 100th competitive goal since joining Bayern Munich in 2003.

On 7 March 2007, Makaay scored the quickest goal in Champions League history, finding the net after just 10.12 seconds to help Bayern overturn a first-leg deficit and put Real Madrid out of the competition at the round of sixteen. Madrid kicked off but Roberto Carlos failed to control the backpass, allowing Bayern's Hasan Salihamidžić to steal the ball and feed it to Makaay who tapped it past goalkeeper Iker Casillas.

Feyenoord
Makaay returned to the Netherlands for the 2007–08 season, when Feyenoord signed him to a three-year deal worth €5 million in June 2007.  Makaay's decision to leave was influenced by Bayern Munich's decision to sign forwards Luca Toni and Miroslav Klose.

In his first season at Feyenoord, Makaay was instrumental in leading the club to their eleventh KNVB Cup title, scoring 7 goals in 5 matches.

Makaay retired at the end of the 2009–10 season, scoring a hat-trick in his last match against Heerenveen.

International career
Makaay scored 15 times for the Dutch U-21 national team, which was a record shared with Arnold Bruggink, before Klaas-Jan Huntelaar eclipsed their tally in 2006.

His international caps for the Dutch national team were limited due to players such as Patrick Kluivert, Dennis Bergkamp and Ruud van Nistelrooy. Makaay was, however, capped for his country at Euro 2000 and Euro 2004. In the latter tournament, he scored against Latvia in the first round.

In 2008, Makaay was chosen as one of three overage players to represent the Netherlands at the Olympics, where he captained the side to a quarter-final defeat to eventual champions Argentina.

Coaching career
After his retirement he was named as a youth coach for the academy of Feyenoord. Alongside this, he was also working as forward coach for the club, both with the first team and youth teams.

In May 2013, the club confirmed that – after as successful year with the C1 team – Makaay would take charge of the U19's for the upcoming season.

On 18 November 2021, he was named first-team coach to Giovanni van Bronckhorst at Rangers.

Career statistics

Club

International

Scores and results list the Netherlands goal tally first, score column indicates score after each Makaay goal.

Managerial

Honours
Deportivo La Coruña
La Liga: 1999–2000
Copa del Rey: 2001–02
Supercopa de España: 2002

Bayern Munich
Bundesliga: 2004–05, 2005–06
DFB-Pokal: 2004–05, 2005–06
DFB-Ligapokal: 2004

Feyenoord
KNVB Cup: 2007–08

Individual
Pichichi Trophy: 2002–03
European Golden Shoe: 2002–03
ESM Team of the Year: 2002–03
FIFA XI (Reserve): 2002
The fastest ever goal in the UEFA Champions League in 10.12 seconds against Real Madrid on 7 March 2007
KNVB Cup Top Scorer: 2007–08

References

External links

Official site 

Makaay's stats at VI.nl 

1975 births
Living people
People from Wijchen
Dutch people of Indonesian descent
Indo people
Dutch footballers
Association football forwards
Netherlands international footballers
Netherlands under-21 international footballers
UEFA Euro 2000 players
UEFA Euro 2004 players
Eredivisie players
Bundesliga players
La Liga players
SC Woezik players
SBV Vitesse players
CD Tenerife players
Deportivo de La Coruña players
FC Bayern Munich footballers
Feyenoord players
Footballers at the 2008 Summer Olympics
Olympic footballers of the Netherlands
Dutch expatriate footballers
Dutch expatriate sportspeople in Germany
Expatriate footballers in Germany
Dutch expatriate sportspeople in Spain
Expatriate footballers in Spain
Pichichi Trophy winners
Rangers F.C. non-playing staff
Footballers from Gelderland
Dutch expatriate sportspeople in Scotland
Association football coaches
Feyenoord non-playing staff